Hope 7 was a pop rock band that performed together from 2002 to 2005. The band members consisted of Kristi McClave (lead singer), Dave Noble (guitarist), Chevy Martinez (bassist), and Chase Duddy (drummer).

Early years 
Performing since the age of six, McClave was discovered by record producer Rodney Jerkins. McClave was then chosen by Antonina Armato and Tim James to be a featured vocalist for the pop group 3Gs. They later recorded the song "Crush" for The Princess Diaries soundtrack. However, finding the right mix of singers for the group proved difficult, and 3Gs eventually disbanded. McClave continued to work with some of the same producers, leading to a more rock-oriented sound. McClave provided the track, "Breakthrough", for the Legally Blonde 2: Red, White & Blonde soundtrack. The artist for that particular track was Hope 7, even though the band's lineup was not final at the time. McClave was signed to Hollywood Records, toured with the MTV TRL tour, and was awarded a Gold Record for her work with the 3Gs.

Performing years 
In early 2004, Noble, Martinez and Duddy joined the band to fully form Hope 7. The song "Breakthrough" was also featured in The Cheetah Girls soundtrack, and the music video for the song was played on Disney Channel, increasing the band's popularity. The band toured with the ATV Pro Volleyball tournament and also released the song "I Want Everything", which was featured in the soundtrack for the 2004 film Sleepover and the 2005 Disney Channel film Go Figure.

The band released their self-titled album, Hope 7, on March 15, 2005 with Trauma Records. It was their only album release.

Hope 7's single "Breakthrough" went platinum, earning the band their only platinum record.

Hope 7 disbanded after the release of their first album. They are no longer performing together.

Discography

Albums
Hope 7 (2005)

Singles
"Breakthrough" (2004)

External links 
Hope 7  Biography at Yahoo Music
Full list of songs by Hope 7 with lyrics and other information

American pop rock music groups
Female-fronted musical groups
Musical groups established in 2003
Musical groups disestablished in 2005